Ted Johnson (born 1972) is a former American football player .

Ted Johnson may also refer to:
Ted Johnson (bandleader) (1903–?), Swedish-American violinist and bandleader
Ted Johnson (footballer, born 1901) (1901–1970), Australian rules footballer for South Melbourne
Ted Johnson (footballer, born 1948), Australian rules footballer for Hawthorn
Ted Johnson (politician) (1909–2002), Australian politician
Ted Johnson (rower) (1924–1985), New Zealand representative rower
Teddy Johnson (1919–2018), English entertainer, one half of the husband-and-wife duo Pearl Carr & Teddy Johnson

See also
Edward Johnson (disambiguation)
Ted Johnstone, pseudonym of David McDaniel, science fiction writer